The 2019–20 Olympique Lyonnais Féminin season was the club's sixthteenth season since FC Lyon joined OL as its women's section. Olympique Lyonnais retained their Division 1 Féminine, Coupe de France Féminine and UEFA Women's Champions League titles.

Season events
On 19 June, Olympique Lyonnais announced the signings of Katriina Talaslahti from Bayern Munich, Janice Cayman from Montpellier, Nikita Parris from Manchester City and Jéssica Silva from Levante.

On 8 August, Olympique Lyonnais announced the signing of Alex Greenwood, on a contract until 30 June 2020, from Manchester United for a fee of €40,000 rising to €60,000 depending on incentives.

On 31 January, Naomie Feller joined Olympique Lyonnais on loan from Stade Reims until the end of the season.

After 16 match days, the season was abandoned due to the COVID-19 pandemic in France. Lyon were declared champions, and Paris joined them in qualification for the 2020–21 UEFA Women's Champions League.

On 11 June, Shanice van de Sanden extended her contract with Olympique Lyonnais until 30 June 2021.

On 17 June 2020, Olympique Lyonnais announced a deal to signing of Ellie Carpenter from Portland Thorns. A week later, 24 June, Sakina Karchaoui joined Olympique Lyonnais from Montpellier on a contract until June 2021.

On 29 June, Lucy Bronze and Alex Greenwood both extended their contracts with Olympique Lyonnais for two-months, taking them to the end of the UEFA Champions League season.

On 1 July 2020, Olympique Lyonnais announced the signings of Lola Gallardo and Sara Gunnarsdóttir on contracts until June 2022.

On 3 July 2020, Olympique Lyonnais confirmed the signing of Ellie Carpenter on a contract until the summer of 2023.

On 4 August 2020, Olympique Lyonnais announced the signing of Jodie Taylor on a contract until 31 December 2020 from OL Reign.

Squad

Transfers

In

Loans in

Out

Loans out

Released

Friendlies

International Champions Cup

Competitions

Overview

Trophée des Championnes

Division 1

Results summary

Results by matchday

Results

Table

Coupe de France

UEFA Champions League

Final

Squad statistics

Appearances 

|-
|colspan="16"|Players away from the club on loan:

|-
|colspan="16"|Players who appeared for Olympique Lyonnais but left during the season:

|}

Goal scorers

Clean sheets

Disciplinary record

References 

Olympique Lyonnais
Olympique Lyonnais Féminin